The 3 Kings was a jazz trio, known as the Three Blind Mice, as they wore dark glasses.  They were formed at Hot Springs High School by Bill Clinton on tenor saxophone, Randy Goodrum on piano and Joe Newman alternating with Mike Hardgraves on drums.    They played in the school auditorium, the Quapaw Community Center and at the YMCA and YWCA, where high school teenagers would dance.  Their advertising slogan was "swing pretty hard with some cool jazz".

References

Three Kings
American jazz ensembles